Utahloy International School Guangzhou (UISG) is a school with English-language class instruction in Baiyun District, Guangzhou. UISG serves students aged 2 to 19 from over 50 different countries. There are seven major native languages, including English, Chinese, Korean, French, Japanese, German, and Spanish. The school offers three types of programs: Primary Year, Middle Year, and Diploma. An average of 18 students per class, with a teacher-to-student ratio of 1 to 8.

Academic accreditation
UISG is accredited by the Council of International Schools (CIS) and Western Association of Schools and Colleges (WASC). It is authorized by the International Baccalaureate Organization to provide the IB Primary Years Programme (IBPYP), IB Middle Years Programme (IBMYP) and IB Diploma Programme (IBDP).

Primary years education 
The IB Primary Years Programme is designed for students aged three to twelve. Languages, Mathematics, Science, and Social Studies are taught in integrated units of inquiry as well as single subject lessons, with the emphasis on making transdisciplinary connections. 

Music, art, mother tongue language classes, and physical education are taught by specialists. An ICT specialist works with primary school teachers to integrate ICT into the curriculum. Staff teaching English as a Second Language work across grade levels as needed.

Middle years education 
The International Baccalaureate Middle Years Programme is a curriculum designed to meet the educational needs of students aged 12 to 16. 

During these years, the Mother Tongue program is implemented, providing languages such as Mandarin, Korean, Japanese, French, German, Spanish, and Italian. Arts, English, Language and Literature, Language Acquisition, Humanities, Mathematics, Physical & Health Education, Science, and Design are the nine components of the curriculum. 

In addition, students must complete their Community & Service requirements as well as their Personal Project by the end of their final IB year.

Athletics
Utahloy is a member of ACAMIS (Association of China and Mongolia International Schools), SDRC (Southern Delta Region Conference), and participates in the PRC (Pearl River Conference) and NUX (Nanjing, Utahloy, Xiamen). 

Students from years 9 to 12 compete in Association Football, Basketball, Volleyball, Badminton, Cross-country, Golf, Table Tennis, Tennis, and Swimming against other international schools from all over China in the Orange Division of ACAMIS. SDRC is for students aged 11 to 14, and they compete in Association Football, Touch Rugby, Volleyball, and Basketball.

References

External links 

 Utahloy International School
 Utahloy International School Guangzhou 
 Utahloy International School Zengcheng 

Educational institutions established in 1997
International schools in Guangzhou
International schools in China
Private schools in China
International Baccalaureate schools in China
Baiyun District, Guangzhou
1997 establishments in China